Raghuvir Sahay (9 December 1929 – 30 December 1990) was an Indian Hindi poet, short-story writer, essayist, literary critic, translator, and journalist. He remained the chief-editor of the political-social Hindi weekly, Dinmaan, 1969–82.

He was awarded the 1984 Sahitya Akademi Award in Hindi for his poetry collection, Log Bhool Gaye Hain (लोग भूल गये हैं) (They Have Forgotten, 1982).

Bibliography
 Sanchayita Raghuvir Sahay (Selected Works), comp. Krishna Kumar.
 Kuch pate kuch chitthiyan (कुछ पते कुछ चिट्ठियाँ)
 Log Bhool Gaye Hain (लोग भूल गये हैं)
 Atmahatya Ke Viruddh (आत्महत्या के विरुद्ध)
 Hanso Hanso Jaldi Hanso (हँसो हँसो जल्दी हँसो)
 Seedhiyon Par Dhoop Hein (सीढ़ियों पर धूप में)

Further reading
 Raghuvir Sahay ki kavyanubhuti aur Kavyabhasha, by Anantakirti Tiwari. 1996, Visvavidyalaya Prakasan
 Raghuvir Sahay aur Malyaz ka Alochana Karam, "Kavita aur Samay" by Arun Kamal.<

References

External links
 Raghuvir Sahay at Kavita Kosh
 Raghuvir Sahay's poetry at Anubhuti
 Raghuvir Sahay (English translations)
 5 of Raghuvir Sahay's last poems at Shabdankan

1929 births
1990 deaths
Writers from Lucknow
20th-century Indian translators
Indian male journalists
Indian literary critics
Hindi-language poets
Hindi-language writers
Recipients of the Sahitya Akademi Award in Hindi
20th-century Indian poets
Journalists from Uttar Pradesh
Poets from Uttar Pradesh
Indian male poets
20th-century Indian male writers
20th-century Indian essayists
20th-century Indian short story writers
20th-century Indian journalists